Treatise on Analysis is a translation by Ian G. Macdonald of the nine-volume work Éléments d'analyse on mathematical analysis by Jean Dieudonné, and is an expansion of his textbook Foundations of Modern Analysis. It is a successor to the various Cours d'Analyse by Augustin-Louis Cauchy, Camille Jordan, and Édouard Goursat.

Contents and publication history

Volume I

The first volume was originally a stand-alone graduate textbook with a different title. It was first written in English and later translated into French, unlike the other volume which were first written in French. It has been republished several times and is much more common than the later volumes of the series.

The contents include 
Chapter I: sets
Chapter II Real numbers
Chapter III Metric spaces
Chapter IV The real line
Chapter V Normed spaces
Chapter VI Hilbert spaces
Chapter VII Spaces of continuous functions
Chapter VIII Differential calculus (This uses the Cauchy integral rather than the more common Riemann integral of functions.)
Chapter IX Analytic functions (of a complex variable)
Chapter X Existence theorems (for ordinary differential equations)
Chapter XI Elementary spectral theory

Volume II
The second volume includes
Chapter XII Topology and topological algebra
Chapter XIII Integration
Chapter XIV Integration in locally compact groups
Chapter XV Normed algebras and spectral theory

Volume III
The third volume includes chapter XVI on differential manifolds and chapter XVII on distributions and differential operators.

Volume IV
The fourth volume includes
Chapter XVIII Differential systems
Chapter XIX Lie groups
Chapter XX Riemannian geometry

Volume V
Volume V consists of chapter XXI on compact Lie groups.

Volume VI
Volume VI consists of chapter XXII on harmonic analysis (mostly on locally compact groups)

Volume VII
Volume VII consists of the first part of chapter XXIII on linear functional equations. This chapter is considerably more advanced than most of the other chapters.

Volume VIII
Volume VIII consists of the second part of chapter XXIII on linear functional equations.

Volume IX

Volume IX contains chapter XXIV on elementary differential topology. Unlike the earlier volumes there is no English translation of it.

Volume X

Dieudonne planned a final volume containing chapter XXV on nonlinear problems, but this was never published.

References

Mathematics books
Mathematical analysis
Treatises